Khames (also Romanized as Khemes; also known as Hamis and Khyms) is a village in Khanandabil-e Sharqi Rural District, in the Central District of Khalkhal County, Ardabil Province, Iran. At the 2006 census, its population was 1,051, in 295 families.

References

External links 
Tageo

Towns and villages in Khalkhal County